Slavery in France, and by extension, the French Empire, covers a wide range of disparate topics. Some of the most notable ones include:

Slavery in Merovingian France 

In 486, Clovis I, the son of Childeric, defeated Syagrius, a Roman military leader who competed with the Merovingians for power in northern France. Slavery in Merovingian France included several Frankish queens in the Merovingian dynasty who had formerly been slaves.

Only five slave queens have been identified in Merovingian France, though there may have been more: Ingund, Fredegund, Bilichild, Nanthild, and Balthild. Slavery continued during the Carolingian Empire.

First abolition of slavery and serfdom in France 

In 1198, the Trinitarians was founded by John of Matha with the purpose of ransoming war captive Christians by Muslims during the Crusades. King Louis IX installed a house of their order at his château of Fontainebleau. He chose Trinitarians as his chaplains, and was accompanied by them on his crusades. The Master of the Trinity was taken captive together with Saint Louis after the Battle of Mansurah.

In 1315, King Louis X passed a decree that abolishes slavery and proclaims "France signifies freedom". The decree entailed that any slave setting foot on French ground should be freed. However some limited cases of slavery continued until the 17th century in some of France's Mediterranean harbors in Provence, as well as until the 18th century in some of France's overseas territories. Most aspects of serfdom were also eliminated de facto between 1315 and 1318. Louis X died two years after this events. In 1318, King Philip V abolished serfdom in his domain.

Slavery in French colonies 

The French colonial empire practiced slavery in its colonies. In the mid-16th century, enslaved people were trafficked from Africa to the Caribbean by European mercantilists. Nor were New France, Louisiana, or French African colonies immune. 

The French West India Company developed tobacco plantations in French colonies. The company had a monopoly on the slave trade from Senegal, which since 1658, belonged to the Company of Cape Verde and Senegal. The slave trade continued under the operation of the Compagnie du Sénégal from 1658 to 1709. The company traded slaves with the Hausa Kingdoms, Mali, and the Moors in Mauritania.

As of 1778, the French were trafficking approximately 13,000 African people as slaves to the French West Indies each year. While slavery had been active in French colonies since the early 16th century, it was theoretically not legitimized by the French government until the Revolutionary convention in 1794.

Slavery in New France 

Slavery was practiced by French colony of New France, by 1750, two thirds of the enslaved peoples in New France were indigenous, and by 1834, most enslaved people were black.

Slave trade 

The city of Nantes played a main role in the slave trade.

Code Noir 

In 1685, King Louis XIV passed the decree known as Code Noir (Black Code). The code defined the conditions of slavery in the French colonial empire.

Second abolition of slavery in France 

The Society of the Friends of the Blacks was founded in Paris in 1788, and remained active until 1793, during the midst of the French Revolution. It was led by Jacques Pierre Brissot, who frequently received advice from British abolitionist Thomas Clarkson, who led the abolitionist movement in Great Britain. At the beginning of 1789, the Society had 141 members.

The second general abolition of slavery took place on 4 February 1794, when slavery was abolished in all French territories and possessions, during the convention, the first elected Assembly of the First Republic (1792–1804), under the leadership of Maximilien Robespierre, abolished slavery in law in France and its colonies. Abbé Grégoire and the Society of the Friends of the Blacks were part of the abolitionist movement, which had laid important groundwork in building anti-slavery sentiment in the metropole. The first article of the law stated that "Slavery was abolished" in the French colonies, while the second article stated that "slave-owners would be indemnified" with financial compensation for the value of their slaves. The French constitution passed in 1795 included a declaration of the rights of man, which abolishes slavery.

Re-introduction of slavery in France in 1802

Napoleon re-introduced slavery in sugarcane-growing colonies through the Law of 20 May 1802. It lasted 13 years and ended in 1815.

End of slavery in France 

In 1815, Napoleon abolished the slave trade. In 1815, The Congress of Vienna declared its opposition to the slave trade. In 1818, the slave trade was banned in France. On July 18–19, 1845, the Mackau Laws were passed, which paved the way towards the abolition of slavery in France.

On April 27, 1848, the Proclamation of the Abolition of Slavery in the French Colonies was made.

The island of martinique was the first French overseas colony where the decree actually came into force, on 23 May 1848. 

Gabon was founded as a settlement for emancipated slaves.

Modern day 

 In 1890, took place the Brussels Conference Act – a collection of anti-slavery measures to put an end to the slave trade on land and sea, especially in the Congo Basin, the Ottoman Empire, and the East African coast.
 In 1904, the International Agreement for the suppression of the White Slave Traffic was signed in Paris. Only France, the Netherlands and Russia extend the treaty to the whole extent of their colonial empires with immediate effect.
 In 1926, the Slavery Convention is ratified by France and other nations.

Even when slavery has been prohibited for more than one century, many criminal organizations continue to practice human trafficking and the slave trade. For this reason, on 25 July 2013, France recognized modern-day slavery as a crime punishable by up to 30 years in jail.

Memorial Associations

A permanent structure in June 1999, known as “Le Comité marche ‘98” (The March ’98 Committee) has been created with the objectives to promote processes of recognition and reparation about the past actions of the French government on the issue of slavery in its former colonies. The second aim of the organization is also to preserve the memory of the abolition .

This association was initially chaired by Serge Romana, a geneticist and leading activist for the recognition of the history of Guadeloupean slavery. A first step in the achievement of the committee’s objectives came with the Taubira Law of 10 May 2001. This law recognizes slavery as a crime against humanity. A second crucial step was taken with the adoption of the Overseas Real Equality Act of 14 February 2017, which established 23 May as the commemorative date for the victims of colonial slavery. The association continues to promote annual commemorations known as “Feasts of Brotherhood and Reconciliation” or “Limié Ba Yo” (which translates as “Let’s put them in the spotlight”) every year on 23 May.

See also 

 Slavery in the British and French Caribbean
 Slavery in the United States
 Slavery in Haiti
 Affranchi
 Race in France
 Slavery museum (France)

References

Slavery in France
Social history of France
Human rights abuses in France
Reparations for slavery